Verbascum lychnitis, the white mullein, is a flowering plant in the figwort family (Scrophulariaceae) native to Asia and Europe. It has naturalized in parts of North America. The species was first formally named by Carl Linnaeus in 1753. Despite its common name, the flowers can be white or yellow.

It is a biennial  or short-lived perennial commonly found in disturbed areas.

Verbascum lychnitis can be distinguished from other species in the genus Verbascum by the sessile and non-clasping stem leaves with upper and lower surfaces differing in color; small, flowers that are separated (not as tightly bunched together as other mulleins); and the somewhat long flower stalks.  As with other Mulleins the leaves are clothed with dendritic hairs. In V. lychnitis, the hairs are very short, less than 0.2 mm, so as to appear stellate. The lower surface is much hairier than the upper.   

It hybridizes with other mullein species , including V.nigrum, V.pulverentum and V.thapsus.

References

Additional Bibliography 

 
 
 
 
 

lychnitis
Flora of Asia
Flora of Europe